The Taipei Economic and Cultural Office in New Zealand represents interests of Taiwan in New Zealand in the absence of formal diplomatic relations, functioning as a de facto embassy.

The office was established in Auckland in 1973 as the East Asian Trade Center. Before 1972, New Zealand recognized Taiwan as the "Republic of China". However, diplomatic relations were ended following the decision of the government of Norman Kirk to recognize the People's Republic of China. It adopted its present name in 1991.

The Office is headed by a Representative, currently Amb. Joanne Ou. 

Its head office is in Wellington, and there is also a branch office in Auckland. 
 
It is counterpart in Taiwan is the New Zealand Commerce and Industry Office in Taipei.

Representatives
 Amb. Joanne Ou(2023–Now) (Curriculum Vitae)
 Joseph Shih (2002–2006)

See also
 List of diplomatic missions of Taiwan
 List of diplomatic missions in New Zealand

External links
 Taipei Economic and Cultural Office in New Zealand

1973 establishments in New Zealand
New Zealand
Taiwan
New Zealand–Taiwan relations
Organizations established in 1973